Disco Party is an album released by Percy Faith and his Orchestra in 1975 on Columbia LP record AS 33549.

Track listing 
 "Cherry, Cherry" (Instrumental) (Neil Diamond) – 4:20
 "El Bimbo" (Claude Morgan) – 2:40
 "The King is Dead" (Instrumental) (Tony Cole) – 2:30
 "Love Music" (Dennis Lambert, Brian Potter) – 3:51
 "7-6-5-4-3-2-1 (Blow Your Whistle)" (Roger Cook) – 3:46
 "Chompin’" [Instrumental] (Percy Faith) – 3:21
 "Mongonucleosis" (Instrumental) (James Pankow) – 2:29
 "Coldwater Morning" (Neil Diamond) – 2:54
 "Substitute" (Willie Harry Wilson) – 2:45
 "Hava Nagilah" (Percy Faith) – 3:38

References

1975 albums
Percy Faith albums
Columbia Records albums
Instrumental albums